The Brown Lady of Raynham Hall is a ghost that reportedly haunts Raynham Hall in Norfolk, England. 
It became one of the most famous hauntings in the United Kingdom when photographers from Country Life magazine claimed to have captured its image. The "Brown Lady" is so named because of the brown brocade dress it is claimed she wears.

Identity of the ghost

According to legend, the "Brown Lady of Raynham Hall" is the ghost of Dorothy Walpole (1686–1726), the sister of Robert Walpole, generally regarded as the first Prime Minister of Great Britain. She was the second wife of Charles Townshend, 2nd Viscount Townshend, who was notorious for his violent temper. The story says that when Townshend discovered that his wife had committed adultery with Lord Wharton, he punished her by locking her in her rooms in the family home, Raynham Hall. According to Mary Wortley Montagu, Dorothy was in fact entrapped by the Countess of Wharton. She invited Dorothy over to stay for a few days knowing that her husband would never allow her to leave, not even to see her children. She remained at Raynham Hall until her death in 1726 from smallpox.

Sightings
The first recorded claim of a sighting of the ghost was by Lucia C. Stone concerning a gathering at Raynham Hall in the Christmas of 1835. Stone says that Charles Townshend had invited various guests to the Hall, including a Colonel Loftus, to join in the Christmas festivities. Loftus and another guest named Hawkins said they had seen the "Brown Lady" one night as they approached their bedrooms, noting in particular the dated brown dress she wore. The following evening Loftus claimed to have seen the "Brown Lady" again, later reporting that on this occasion he was drawn to the spectre's empty eye-sockets, dark in the glowing face. Loftus' sightings led to some staff permanently leaving Raynham Hall.

The next reported sighting of the "Brown Lady" was made in 1836 by Captain Frederick Marryat, a friend of novelist Charles Dickens, and the author of a series of popular sea novels. It is said that Marryat requested that he spend the night in the most haunted room of Raynham Hall to prove his theory that the haunting was caused by local smugglers anxious to keep people away from the area. Writing in 1891, Florence Marryat said of her father's experience:

Lady Townshend reported that the "Brown Lady" was next seen in 1926, when her son and his friend claimed to have seen the ghost on the staircase, identifying the ghostly figure with the portrait of Lady Dorothy Walpole which then hung in the haunted room.

Ever since Marryat's encounter with the Brown Lady, sightings of her have dwindled - with some claiming that she now haunts nearby Houghton Hall and Sandringham House.

Country Life magazine

On September 19, 1936, Captain Hubert C. Provand, a London-based photographer working for Country Life magazine, and his assistant, Indre Shira, were taking photographs of Raynham Hall for an article. They claim that they had already taken a photograph of the Hall's main staircase and were setting up to take a second when Shira saw "a vapoury form gradually assuming the appearance of a woman" moving down the stairs towards them. Under Shira's direction Provand quickly took the cap off the lens while Shira pressed the trigger to activate the camera's flash. Later, when the negative was developed, the famous image of the "Brown Lady" was revealed. The account of Provand and Shira's ghostly experience at Raynham Hall was published in Country Life magazine on December 26, 1936 along with the photograph of the Brown Lady. The photograph and the account of its taking also appeared in the January 4, 1937 edition of Life magazine.
 
Shortly thereafter, the noted paranormal investigator Harry Price interviewed Provand and Shira and reported, "I will say at once I was impressed. I was told a perfectly simple story: Mr. Indre Shira saw the apparition descending the stairs at the precise moment when Captain Provand’s head was under the black cloth. A shout – and the cap was off and the flashbulb fired, with the results which we now see. I could not shake their story, and I had no right to disbelieve them. Only collusion between the two men would account for the ghost if it is a fake. The negative is entirely innocent of any faking."

Skeptical reception

Some critics have claimed that Shira faked the image by putting grease or a similar substance on the lens in the shape of a figure, or moved down the stairs himself during an exposure. Others claim that the image is an accidental double exposure or that light somehow got into the camera.

Joe Nickell has written that a detailed examination of the photograph shows evidence of double exposure. John Fairley and Simon Welfare wrote "there is a pale line above each stair-tread, indicating that one picture has been superimposed over the other; a patch of reflected light at the top of the right-hand banister appears twice."

The magician John Booth wrote the photograph could easily be duplicated by naturalistic methods. Booth had the magician Ron Wilson cover himself in a bed sheet and descend the grand staircase at The Magic Castle in Hollywood. The faked ghost image looked very similar to the Raynham Hall photograph.

Other critics point out that the image of the lady very closely resembles that of a standard Virgin Mary statue as would be found in any Catholic church, the light patch covering the bottom one third of the image, resembling an inverted "V" shape, being very indicative, as the outer garment above it drapes down on either side at an angle. Also the head is covered and the hands appear to be together as in prayer, and the square or rectangular pedestal on which she stands is also clearly visible. This strongly suggests that the photo is a simple superimposition of the Madonna statue onto the empty staircase.

See also
List of ghosts

References

External links
 'The Brown Lady of Raynham' on the Museum of Hoaxes website
 Analysis of the photograph of the 'Brown Lady' in the Fortean Times

English ghosts
Supernatural legends
Female legendary creatures
People notable for being the subject of a specific photograph
Norfolk folklore
1936 works
1936 in art
1930s photographs
Black-and-white photographs